Ulva conglobata is a species of seaweed in the family Ulvaceae that can be found on Jeju Island of Korea, Qingdao province of China and Yokohama, Japan.

Description

Uses
Its methanol extract is used to treat Alzheimer's disease while its ethanol have polysaccharides which contains 23.04-35.20% of sulfate ester with 10.82-14.91% of uronic acid, and 3.82-451% of protein. It also produces crude enzyme when its mixed with linoleic acid which is widely used to fight influenza.

References

Further reading

External links

Ulvaceae
Plants described in 1897
Flora of Asia